The Bear River is a  tidal river in the U.S. state of Georgia. It forms the channel that separates Ossabaw Island from the Georgia mainland, connecting with the Ogeechee River at its north end and the Medway River at its south.

See also
List of rivers of Georgia

References 

Rivers of Georgia (U.S. state)
Rivers of Chatham County, Georgia